Southern Miladhunmadulu Atoll or Noonu is a local administrative division of the Maldives corresponding to the southern section of Miladhunmadulu Atoll. The capital is Manadhoo.

The Channel to the west of this atoll is called Baraveli Kandu. "Baraveli" means hermit crab in Divehi.

References
 Divehi Tārīkhah Au Alikameh. Divehi Bahāi Tārikhah Khidmaiykurā Qaumī Markazu. Reprint 1958 edn. Malé 1990. 
 Divehiraajjege Jōgrafīge Vanavaru. Muhammadu Ibrahim Lutfee. G.Sōsanī.
 Xavier Romero-Frias, The Maldive Islanders, A Study of the Popular Culture of an Ancient Ocean Kingdom. Barcelona 1999.

Atolls of the Maldives

dv:މިލަދުންމަޑުލު ދެކުނުބުރި
es:Atolón Noonu